Venarotta is a comune (municipality) in the province of Ascoli Piceno in the Italian region of Marche.

Venarotta borders the following municipalities: Ascoli Piceno, Force, Palmiano, Roccafluvione, Rotella.

Twin towns
 Lantriac, France

References

Cities and towns in the Marche